Redbridge London Borough Council in London, England is elected every four years.

Political control
The first election to the council was held in 1964, initially operating as a shadow authority ahead of the new system coming into full effect the following year. Since 1964 political control of the council has been held by the following parties:

Leadership
The leaders of the council since 1965 have been:

Council elections
 1964 Redbridge London Borough Council election
 1968 Redbridge London Borough Council election
 1971 Redbridge London Borough Council election
 1974 Redbridge London Borough Council election
 1978 Redbridge London Borough Council election (boundary changes increased the number of seats by three)
 1982 Redbridge London Borough Council election
 1986 Redbridge London Borough Council election
 1990 Redbridge London Borough Council election
 1994 Redbridge London Borough Council election (boundary changes reduced the number of seats by one)
 1998 Redbridge London Borough Council election (boundary changes took place but the number of seats remained the same)
 2002 Redbridge London Borough Council election (boundary changes increased the number of seats by one) 
 2006 Redbridge London Borough Council election
 2010 Redbridge London Borough Council election
 2014 Redbridge London Borough Council election
 2018 Redbridge London Borough Council election
 2022 Redbridge London Borough Council election

Borough result maps

By-election results

1964-1968
There were no by-elections.

1968-1971

1971-1974

1974-1978

1978-1982

1982-1986

1986-1990

1990-1994

The by-election was called following the death of Cllr. Arnold Kinzley.

The by-election was called following the death of Cllr. Nancy H. Thurgood.

1994-1998

The by-election was called following the resignation of Cllr. Raymond A. Ward.

The by-election was called following the death of Cllr. Brian R. Myers.

The by-election was called following the death of Cllr. Thomas F. Cobb. 

The by-election was called following the resignation of Cllr. David A. Masters.

The by-election was called following the resignation of Cllr. Linda Perham.

1998-2002

The by-election was called following the resignation of Cllr. Desmond M. Thurlby.

2002-2006

The by-election was called following the disqualification of Cllr. Dev R. Sharma.

The by-election was called following the death of Cllr. Keith E. Axon.

The by-election was called following the death of Cllr. Gary D. Scottow.

2006-2010

The by-election was called following the death of Cllr. James Leal.

The by-election was called following the death of Cllr. Simon Green.

The by-election was called following the death of Cllr. Charles Elliman.

The by-election was called following the resignation of Cllr. Nadia J. Sharif.

The by-election was called following the death of Cllr. Allan C. Burgess.

2010-2014

The by-election was called following the disqualification of Cllr. Mark Gittens.

The by-election was called following the resignation of Cllr. Mike Figg.

2014-2018

The by-election was triggered by the resignation of Councillor Sarah Blaber (Conservative).

References

External links
 Redbridge Council